Roy William Parker (February 29, 1896 – May 17, 1954) was an American pitcher in Major League Baseball. After serving in the United States Navy during World War I, he played for the St. Louis Cardinals in 1919.

References

External links

1896 births
1954 deaths
United States Navy personnel of World War I
Baseball players from Missouri
Major League Baseball pitchers
People from Union, Missouri
St. Louis Cardinals players
United States Navy sailors